Nikolai Danilin (1878–1945) was a Russian choral conductor. He was born in Moscow in 1878 and also died there in 1945 at the age of 76.

Danilin graduated from the Moscow Synod School in 1897 and from the Music and Drama School of the Moscow Philharmonic Society from the piano class of A. N. Koreshchenko in 1907. In 1904 he became assistant director of the Synod Choir and from 1910 to 1918 was its principal director. In 1911, while under his direction, the choir toured Italy, Austria, and Germany, where it demonstrated examples of Russian choral art. After the Great October Socialist Revolution, Danilin directed the best choral groups in the country (the State Choir of the USSR and the Leningrad Academic Choir). In 1923 he began teaching at the Moscow Conservatory, becoming a professor in 1930.

During his time at the synod choir, he conducted the 1915 premiere of Rachmaninoff's All Night Vigil which was, in the minds of many, the composers finest achievement and is indeed one of the finest choral works written to date.

1878 births
1945 deaths
Musicians from Moscow
Conductors (music) from the Russian Empire
Soviet conductors (music)